The AMP Building is a high rise office block in the Sydney central business district on the corner of Alfred, Phillip and Young Streets.

History
In 1958, the AMP Society announced plans to build a new headquarters in the Sydney central business district on the corner of Alfred, Phillip and Young Streets. It was designed by Peddle, Thorp and Walker architects and was the tallest building in Australia, being opened on 23 November 1962 by Prime Minister Robert Menzies. It had an observation deck on its roof and had over a million visitors in the first 2 years.

References

External links

Buildings and structures in Sydney
Office buildings completed in 1962
1962 establishments in Australia